DDB1 and CUL4 associated factor 15 is a protein that in humans is encoded by the DCAF15 gene.

DCAF15 forms a complex with CUL4A or CUL4B that has E3 ubiquitin ligase activity and is responsible for the proteasome degradation of certain proteins.

References